Stephanie "Steffi" Grebe (born 24 September 1987) is a German para table tennis player who was born without her left and right forearms, she is a right-handed player. She won the silver medal in the women's individual C6 event at the 2016 Summer Paralympics held in Rio de Janeiro, Brazil.

In 2021, she won one of the bronze medals in the women's individual C6 event at the 2020 Summer Paralympics held in Tokyo, Japan.

References

External links
 
 

1987 births
Living people
German female table tennis players
Paralympic table tennis players of Germany
Paralympic silver medalists for Germany
Paralympic bronze medalists for Germany
Paralympic medalists in table tennis
Table tennis players at the 2012 Summer Paralympics
Table tennis players at the 2016 Summer Paralympics
Table tennis players at the 2020 Summer Paralympics
Medalists at the 2016 Summer Paralympics
Medalists at the 2020 Summer Paralympics